Hayrat is a town and district of Trabzon Province, located in the Black Sea region of Turkey. The mayor is Mehmet Nuhoğlu (AKP).

History 
During World War I, occupied by the Russians, Hayrat was freed from the occupation on 28 February 1918.

References

External links
 District governor's official website 

Populated places in Trabzon Province
Districts of Trabzon Province